The 2015 Men's Hockey Under–21 Invitational Tournament was an invitational women's under–21 field hockey competition, hosted by Hockey Netherlands. The tournament took place between 18 and 25 July 2015 in Breda, Netherlands. A total of six teams competed for the title. It was held alongside a women's tournament.

Belgium won the tournament, defeating Germany 2–1 in the final. England defeated India 3–0 in the third place match.

Teams
Including the Netherlands, 5 teams were invited by Hockey Netherlands to participate in the tournament. The team from England however, comprised players up to 23 years of age.

 
 
 
 
  (host nation)

Officials
The following umpires were appointed by the International Hockey Federation to officiate the tournament:

 Fraser Bell (SCO)
 Jens Brieschke (GER)
 Michael Dutrieux (BEL)
 Sherif El-Amari (EGY)
 Deepak Joshi (IND)
 Jasper Nagtzaam (NED)
 Bevan Nichol (NZL)
 Paul Walker (ENG)

Results

Preliminary round

Fixtures

Classification matches

Fifth and sixth place

Third and fourth place

Final

Statistics

Final standings

Goalscorers

References

External links
International Hockey Federation

July 2015 sports events in Europe